Podyachevo (Podďaćöv) is a rural locality (a village) in Chazyovskoye Rural Settlement, Kosinsky District, Perm Krai, Russia. The population was 143 as of 2010. There are 2 streets.

Geography 
Podyachevo is located 29 km west of Kosa (the district's administrative centre) by road. Chazevo is the nearest rural locality.

References 

Rural localities in Kosinsky District